Sarah McLean (born 23 September 1967) is a Canadian sailor. She competed in the women's 470 event at the 1992 Summer Olympics.

References

External links
 

1967 births
Living people
Canadian female sailors (sport)
Olympic sailors of Canada
Sailors at the 1992 Summer Olympics – 470
Sportspeople from London